Cascais Rugby Linha is a Portuguese rugby union team. Their coach, as player-coach, is currently Nuno Durão. The team lost the final of the Second Division tournament to Vitória Setúbal, in May 2008, missing the chance of reaching the First Division.

External links
Cascais Rugby Linha at Blogspot

Portuguese rugby union teams
Sport in Cascais